Faloreia is a former municipality in the Trikala regional unit, Thessaly, Greece. Since the 2011 local government reform it is part of the municipality Trikala, of which it is a municipal unit. The municipal unit has an area of 76.329 km2. Its population was 3,966 in 2011. The seat of the municipality was in Kefalovryso.

References

Populated places in Trikala (regional unit)

el:Δήμος Τρικκαίων#Φαλωρείας